NGC 4612 is a barred lenticular galaxy located about 57 million light-years away in the constellation of Virgo. NGC 4612 was discovered by astronomer William Herschel on January 23, 1784. The galaxy is a member of the Virgo Cluster.

Physical characteristics
NGC 4612 has a diffuse bar embedded in a small, bright nucleus. Surrounding the nucleus, there is a very low-surface-brightness ring.

See also 
 List of NGC objects (4001–5000)
 NGC 4429- another lenticular galaxy in the Virgo Cluster
 NGC 7020

References

External links

Barred lenticular galaxies
Virgo (constellation)
4612
42574
7850
Astronomical objects discovered in 1784
Virgo Cluster